Edwin R. Thiele (10 September 1895 – 15 April 1986) was an American Seventh-day Adventist missionary in China, an editor, archaeologist, writer, and Old Testament professor. He is best known for his chronological studies of the kingdoms of Judah and Israel.

Biography 
Thiele was born and raised in Chicago, Illinois on September 10th, 1895. He graduated from Emmanuel Missionary College (which became Andrews University in 1960) in 1918 with a BA degree in ancient languages. After two years of work as home missionary secretary for the East Michigan Conference of Seventh-day Adventists, he left in 1920 for mission service in China. During his 12 years in China, he was an editor and manager for the Signs of the Times Publishing House in Shanghai.

After returning to the United States, Thiele studied archaeology, obtaining his MA from the University of Chicago in 1937. He then joined the religion faculty of Emmanuel Missionary College, while continuing his doctoral work at the University of Chicago. He obtained a PhD degree in biblical archaeology in 1943. His doctoral dissertation, The Chronology of the Kings of Judah and Israel, was later expanded and published as The Mysterious Numbers of the Hebrew Kings which is widely regarded as an important work on the chronology of Hebrew kings. He traveled extensively throughout the Middle East in the course of his research.

In addition, Thiele also authored a popular book on Christianity, Knowing God.  After his death, his widow, Margaret, completed his study of the Book of Job entitled Job and the Devil.

From 1963 to 1965, he served as Professor of Antiquity at Andrews University. After retiring from teaching in 1965, he moved to California, where he continued to write. He died in St. Helena, California, in 1986. He is buried in Rose Hill Cemetery in Berrien Springs, Michigan.

Reception of his work 
Thiele's chronological reconstruction has not been accepted by all scholars. Yet the work of Thiele and those who followed in his steps has achieved acceptance across a wider spectrum than that of any comparable chronology, so that Assyriologist D. J. Wiseman (1993) wrote "The chronology most widely accepted today is one based on the meticulous study by Thiele". More recently, in 2010, Leslie McFall asserted, "Thiele's chronology is fast becoming the consensus view among Old Testament scholars, if it has not already reached that point."

Although criticism has been leveled at numerous specific points in his chronology, his work has won considerable praise even from those who disagree with his final conclusions. Nevertheless, even scholars sharing Thiele's religious convictions have maintained that there are weaknesses in his argument such as unfounded assumptions and assumed circular reasoning.

In his desire to resolve the discrepancies between the data in the Book of Kings, Thiele was forced to make improbable suppositions ... There is no basis for Thiele's statement that his conjectures are correct because he succeeded in reconciling most of the data in the Book of Kings, since his assumptions ... are derived from the chronological data themselves ...'The numerous extrabiblical synchronisms he invokes do not always reflect the latest refinements in Assyriological research (cf. E.2.f below). In many cases, he posits an undocumented event in order to save a biblical datum (e.g., the circumstances surrounding the appointment of Jeroboam II as coregent; Thiele 1983: 109).', Freedman, D. N. (1996). Vol. 1: The Anchor Yale Bible Dictionary (1006). New York: Doubleday.

In response to the "circular reasoning" argument, Kenneth Strand has pointed out several archaeological finds that were published after Thiele produced his chronology, and which verified Thiele's assumptions or conclusions vs. the chronological systems of other scholars such as Albright that were posited before Thiele's work. In scientific methodology, the ability to predict new results that were not known when a theory was formulated is regarded as support for the provisional acceptance of a theory until a better theory can be produced.

Despite the various criticisms Thiele's methodological treatment remains the typical starting point of scholarly treatments of the subject, and his work is considered to have established the date of the division of the Israelite kingdom.

See also 
 The Mysterious Numbers of the Hebrew Kings
 Old Testament: Timeline
 History and the Bible
 Valerius Coucke

References 

Andrews University alumni
American biblical scholars
American Seventh-day Adventists
1895 births
1986 deaths
Writers from Chicago
Old Testament scholars
University of Chicago alumni
Andrews University faculty
People from St. Helena, California
20th-century American non-fiction writers
20th-century American archaeologists
Historians from Illinois
Historians from California